A. J. Graves (born August 15, 1985) is an American basketball player who played college basketball with the Butler University Bulldogs. He played one year professionally with PBG Basket Poznań in the Polish Basketball League.

College statistics 

|-
| style="text-align:left;"| 2004–05
| style="text-align:left;"| Butler
| 28 || 23 || 31.6 || .414 || .341 || .919 || 2.2 || 2.8 || 1.3 || 0.1 || 11.1
|-
| style="text-align:left;"| 2005–06
| style="text-align:left;"| Butler
| 33 || 33 || 32.4 || .402 || .374 || .819 || 2.3 || 2.4 || 1.3 || 0.0 || 13.4
|-
| style="text-align:left;"| 2006–07
| style="text-align:left;"| Butler
| 35 || 34 || 35.6 || .375 || .354 || .948 || 2.3 || 2.4 || 1.5 || 0.1 || 16.9
|-
| style="text-align:left;"| 2007–08
| style="text-align:left;"| Butler
| 34 || 34 || 35.2 || .375 || .338 || .889 || 2.9 || 2.2 || 1.6 || 0.1 || 13.6
|- class="sortbottom"
| style="text-align:center;" colspan="2"| Career
| 130 || 124 || 33.8 || .432 || .351 || .900 || 2.4 || 2.4 || 1.4 || 0.1 || 13.9

References

External links 
 Official Butler bio

1985 births
Living people
American expatriate basketball people in Poland
Basketball players from Indiana
Butler Bulldogs men's basketball players
People from Greene County, Indiana
American men's basketball players
Shooting guards